Nancy Marie Lopez (born January 6, 1957) is an American former professional golfer. She became a member of the LPGA Tour in 1977 and won 48 LPGA Tour events, including three major championships.

Amateur career

Lopez won the New Mexico Women's Amateur at age 12 in 1969, and the U.S. Girls' Junior in 1972 and 1974, at ages 15 and 17, respectively. Shortly after graduation from Goddard High School in Roswell, she played in the U.S. Women's Open as an amateur, first in 1974 and again in 1975 where she tied for second.

As a collegiate freshman in 1976, Lopez was named All-American and Female Athlete of the Year for her play at the University of Tulsa. That year she won the Association of Intercollegiate Athletics for Women (AIAW) national intercollegiate golf championship and was a member of the U.S. Curtis Cup and World Amateur teams. Lopez left college after her sophomore year and turned pro in 1977, and again was the runner-up at the U.S. Women's Open.

Professional career
During her first full season on the LPGA Tour in 1978, Lopez won nine tournaments, including five consecutive. She appeared on the cover of Sports Illustrated in July, won the Vare Trophy for lowest scoring average, LPGA Rookie of the Year, LPGA Player of the Year and was named the Associated Press Female Athlete of the Year. She won another eight times in 1979, and won multiple times in each year from 1980 to 1984, although she played only half-seasons in 1983 and 1984 due to the birth of her first child.

Playing full-time again in 1985, Lopez posted five wins, five seconds, five thirds, won the money title, the scoring title, the Player of the Year Award, and was named Associated Press Female Athlete of the Year for a second time. She entered only four events in 1986, when her second daughter was born, but came back with multiple wins in 1987–89 - three times each in 1988 and 1989 - and once again won Player of the Year honors in 1988. Lopez' schedule was curtailed again in the early 1990s when her third daughter was born. In 1992 she won twice. Lopez continued to play short schedules - from 11 to 18 tournaments - through 2002, then in 2003 cut back to just a half dozen or fewer events a year.

Lopez was considered to be one of the greats of women's golf, and she was the game's best player from the late 1970s to late 1980s. She won three majors, and all were at the LPGA Championship, at the same course, in 1978, 1985, and 1989. Lopez never won the U.S. Women's Open, but finished second four times, the last in 1997 when she became the first in the event's history to score under 70 for all four rounds, yet lost to Alison Nicholas. She won the Colgate-Dinah Shore in 1981, two years before it became a major, and was a runner-up three times at the du Maurier Classic in Canada.

Lopez was inducted into the World Golf Hall of Fame in 1987. She was a member of the United States Solheim Cup team in 1990 and was captain of the team in 2005. Lopez retired from regular tournament play in 2002 and attempted a return in 2007 and 2008. In her return season, she played six tournaments, missed the cut in each, and only broke 80 in three of the 12 rounds. In 2008, she played in three events, with a low score of 76, never making the cut. She was inducted into the Georgia Sports Hall of Fame in 2002.

Lopez is the only woman to win LPGA Rookie of the Year, Player of the Year, and the Vare Trophy in the same season (1978). Her company, Nancy Lopez Golf, makes a full line of women's clubs and accessories. She also does occasional television commentary.

Personal life
Lopez was married to Houston sportscaster Tim Melton from 1979 to 1982. Shortly after her divorce, she married Major League All-Star baseball player Ray Knight, then a member of the Houston Astros, in October 1982 in Pelham, Georgia. They were married for 27 years, divorcing in 2009, and have three daughters. While married, Lopez and Knight lived in Georgia in his hometown of Albany. Since 1986, she has hosted the Nancy Lopez Hospice Golf Classic at the Doublegate Country Club to raise money for Albany Community Hospice, returning yearly even after her divorce from Knight in 2009. She currently resides in The Villages, Florida where she hosts an annual golf tournament to benefit the charity AIM (Adventures in Movement), an organization that helps mentally challenged, visually impaired, hearing impaired, physically handicapped and other children and adults with special needs. She has hosted the tournament since 1981 and also serves as a national ambassador with AIM. In 2008, Lopez donated $5,000 to the  Republican National Committee. In 2017, Lopez married for a third time to Ed Russell.

Amateur wins
this list may be incomplete
 1969 New Mexico Women's Amateur
 1970 New Mexico Women's Amateur
 1971 New Mexico Women's Amateur
 1972 U.S. Girls' Junior, Women's Western Junior
 1973 Women's Western Junior
 1974 U.S. Girls' Junior, Women's Western Junior
 1975 Mexican Amateur
 1976 AIAW National Championship, Women's Western Amateur, Women's Trans National Amateur

Professional wins (51)

LPGA Tour wins (48)

Note: Lopez won the Colgate-Dinah Shore (now known as the Kraft Nabisco Championship) before it became a major championship.

LPGA Tour playoff record (8–7)

LPGA of Japan Tour wins (1)
1982 (1) Mazda Japan Classic1
1Co-sanctioned by the LPGA Tour

Other wins (3)
 1979 Portland Ping Team Championship (with Jo Ann Washam)
 1980 JCPenney Mixed Team Classic (with Curtis Strange)
 1987 Mazda Champions (with Miller Barber)

Major championships

Wins (3)

Results timeline

^ The Women's British Open replaced the du Maurier Classic as an LPGA major in 2001.

LA = Low amateur
CUT = missed the half=way cut.
WD = withdrew
"T" = tied

U.S. national team appearances
Amateur
 Curtis Cup: 1976 (winners)
 Espirito Santo Trophy: 1976 (winners)

Professional
 Solheim Cup: 1990 (winners), 2005 (non-playing captain, winners)
 Handa Cup: 2011 (winners), 2012 (tie, Cup retained), 2013

See also
 List of golfers with most LPGA Tour wins
 List of golfers with most LPGA major championship wins

References

Further reading
 Katherine M. Jamieson. "Reading Nancy Lopez: Decoding Representations of Race, Class, and Sexuality"
 Baca Zinn, Maxine and Bonnie Thornton Dill. "Theorizing Difference from Multiracial Feminism." Feminist Theory Reader. Carole R. McCann & Seung-Kyung Kim, eds. New York, NY: Routledge Press, 2003.

External links
 
 
 
 Nancy Lopez (biography in the New Georgia Encyclopedia)
 
 Nancy Lopez on Latino sports legends

American female golfers
Tulsa Golden Hurricane women's golfers
LPGA Tour golfers
Winners of LPGA major golf championships
World Golf Hall of Fame inductees
Solheim Cup competitors for the United States
Golfers from California
Golfers from New Mexico
Golfers from Georgia (U.S. state)
American sportspeople of Mexican descent
Sportspeople from Torrance, California
People from Roswell, New Mexico
Sportspeople from Albany, Georgia
People from The Villages, Florida
1957 births
Living people